In Khalil also known as El Khalil is a rural border town in Mali.  It is known for smugglers who slip through cigarettes, fuel, and weapons into Algeria.  The village is also notable for being the site of the Battle of Khalil.

History 

In Khalil is primarily inhabited by Tuareqs and Arabs.  During the Northern Mali conflict, the MUJAO launched suicide attacks in In Khalil.

On 23 February 2013, the MAA had taken the city.  The MNLA and the French cooperated to take In Khalil.  French fighter jets and MNLA soldiers attacked In-Khalil and took it from the MAA.

References 

Populated places in Kidal Region